Lampropeltis triangulum gaigeae, commonly known as the black milk snake, is a non-venomous subspecies of milk snake. It is the largest known milk snake subspecies. Black milk snakes are found in the mountains of Costa Rica and Panama.

Description

Hatchling black milk snakes are between 12 and 16 inches in length. They are red, black, and white or yellow as hatchlings. When they are between 6 and 10 months of age, the black milk snakes will begin to change colors, and start to turn black as they grow to adulthood. Adult black milk snakes average between 48 and 76 inches (4 feet – 6 feet 4 inches), but some have been known to grow up to 7 feet in length.

Geographic range

Black milk snakes are native to Costa Rica and Panama. They typically live in the wet, high mountain cloud forests at elevations between 5,000 and 7,400 feet in Costa Rica, and between 4,300–6,500 feet in Panama.

Diet
Black milk snakes typically eat mice, reptiles, amphibians, invertebrates, reptile eggs, birds, and bird eggs in the wild.

Captivity
Black milk snakes can make excellent pets for many people. They are typically very hardy snakes in captivity. As hatchlings they will readily accept mice, and as adults may consume medium-sized rats. Since they dwell in high elevations in the wild, they do well with their temperatures between 72 and 78 degrees Fahrenheit. If they are kept at temperatures between 80 - 85 degrees, they metabolize their food much more quickly than other colubrids, and can become overweight very easily.

References

Lampropeltis
Snakes of Central America
Reptiles of Costa Rica